Carolina del Pilar Costagrande (born 15 October 1980 in El Trébol, Santa Fe, Argentina) is an Argentine born professional volleyball player who became a naturalized Italian. She currently plays for Vakıfbank Spor Kulübü. She played for Argentina between 1999-02 and has played for the Italian national team since 2009.

Career
Costagrande won the gold medal at the 2013 Club World Championship playing with Vakıfbank Istanbul.

Costagrande won the silver medal in the 2013–14 CEV Champions League when her Turkish club VakıfBank İstanbul defeated 3-1 to Eczacıbaşı VitrA Istanbul in the semifinal but lost 0-3 to the Russian Dinamo Kazan in the Championship match. She was awarded tournament's Best Receiver.

She played with her national team at the 2014 World Championship. There her team ended up in fourth place after losing 2-3 to Brazil the bronze medal match.

Clubs
  Club Trebolense (1995–1998)
  Rio Marsì Palermo (1998–1999)
  Brums Busto Arsizio (1999–2000)
  Mirabilandia Teodora Ravenna (2000–2001)
  Monte Schiavo Banca Marche Jesi 2001–2003
  PinetaGuru Ravenna (2003–2004)
  Infotel Europa Systems Forlì (2004–2005)
  Scavolini Pesaro (2005–2010)
  Dynamo Moscow (2010–2011)
  Guangdong Evergrande (2011–2013)
  VakıfBank İstanbul (2013–2015)
  Impel Wroclaw (2015–2016)
  Imoco Volley Conegliano (2016–2018)

Awards

Individuals
 2011 World Cup "Most Valuable Player"
 2013-14 CEV Champions League "Best Receiver"

Clubs
 2005-06 CEV Cup -  Champion, with Scavolini Pesaro
 2006 Italian Supercup -  Champion, with Scavolini Pesaro
 2007 Italian Cup -  Runner-Up, with Scavolini Pesaro
 2007-08 Italian Championship -  Champion, with Scavolini Pesaro
 2007-08 Top Teams Cup  -  Champion, with Scavolini Pesaro
 2008 Italian Supercup -  Champion, with Scavolini Pesaro
 2008 Italian Cup -  Runner-Up, with Scavolini Pesaro
 2008-09 Italian Championship -  Champion, with Scavolini Pesaro
 2009 Italian Supercup -  Champion, with Scavolini Pesaro
 2009 Italian Cup -  Champion, with Scavolini Pesaro
 2009-10 Italian Championship -  Champion, with Scavolini Pesaro
 2010–11 Russian Championship -  Runner-Up, with Dynamo Moscow
 2011-12 Chinese Championship -  Champion, with Guangdong Evergrande
 2012-13 Chinese Championship -  Runner-Up, with Guangdong Evergrande
 2013 Asian Club Championship -  Champion, with Guangdong Evergrande
 2013 Club World Championship -  Champion, with Vakıfbank Istanbul
 2013 Turkish Supercup -  Champion, with VakıfBank İstanbul
 2013-14 Turkish Women's Volleyball Cup -  Champion, with VakıfBank İstanbul
 2013–14 CEV Champions League -  Runner-Up, with VakıfBank İstanbul
 2013–14 Turkish Women's Volleyball League -  Champion, with VakıfBank İstanbul
 2014 Turkish Supercup -  Champion, with VakıfBank İstanbul
 2014–15 Turkish Women's Volleyball Cup -  Runner-Up, with VakıfBank İstanbul
 2014–15 CEV Champions League -  Bronze medal, with VakıfBank İstanbul
 2014–15 Turkish Women's Volleyball League -  Runner-Up, with VakıfBank İstanbul

References

External links
 
 
 
 

1980 births
Living people
Italian women's volleyball players
Argentine emigrants to Italy
Argentine women's volleyball players
Volleyball players at the 2012 Summer Olympics
Olympic volleyball players of Italy
Wing spikers
Italian expatriate sportspeople in Russia
Italian expatriate sportspeople in China
Italian expatriate sportspeople in Turkey
Italian expatriates in Poland
Expatriate volleyball players in Russia
Expatriate volleyball players in China
Expatriate volleyball players in Turkey
Expatriate volleyball players in Poland
Sportspeople from Santa Fe Province